Events in the year 1895 in Belgium.

Incumbents
Monarch: Leopold II
Prime Minister: Jules de Burlet

Events

 24 January – Compagnie Maritime Belge founded
 3 February – Marie-Thérèse Joniaux condemned to death for multiple poisonings
 21 July – International choral competition in Liège opens
 1 September – Royal Belgian Football Association founded
 13 November – Lumière brothers demonstrate the cinematograph at the Physics Museum of the Catholic University of Leuven, one of the first such demonstrations outside France.
 5 December – Founding committee of the Belgian Automobile Club holds first meeting in Taverne de la Régence, Place Royale, Brussels.

Publications

Periodicals
 Le Vingtième Siècle begins publication
 Le Congo illustré ends publication

Scholarship
 Biographie Nationale de Belgique, vol. 13.
 Maurice De Wulf, Histoire de la Philosophie Scolastique dans les Pays-Bas et la Principauté de Liège, jusqu'à la Révolution française
 Auguste Lameere, Manuel de la faune de Belgique: Animaux non insectes
 Edmond Marchal, La sculpture et les chefs-d'oeuvre de l'orfèvrerie belges (Brussels, F. Hayez)
 Édouard van den Corput, L'alcoolisme, l'hérédité et la question sociale (1895)

Literature
 Maurice Maeterlinck, Interior, premiered at the Théâtre de l'Œuvre, 15 March.
 Émile Verhaeren, Les villes tentaculaires (Brussels, Edmond Deman)
 Émile Verhaeren, Almanach, a collection of verse with illustrations by Théo van Rysselberghe

Art and Architecture
Painting
 Prix de Rome: Jean Delville

Architecture
 Victor Horta, Hôtel van Eetvelde, built for Edmond van Eetvelde

Births
 undated
 Henri Smets, athlete (died 1994)
 6 February – Jean-Pierre Vermetten, Olympic swimmer
 13 February – Paul Nougé, poet (died 1967)
 10 March
Mathieu Bragard, footballer (died 1952)
Jules Vanhevel, cyclist (died 1969)
 9 April – Clément Doucet, pianist (died 1950)
 19 April – Herman Roosdorp, racing driver (died 1965)
 23 April – Robert Coppée, footballer (died 1970)
 7 May – Adolphe Goemaere, Olympic sportsman (died 1970)
 18 May – Herman de Gaiffier d'Hestroy, Olympic equestrian (died 1960)
 28 May – Yvonne Hubert, pianist (died 1988)
 5 June – August Baeyens, composer (died 1966)
 25 June – Alice Frey, painter (died 1981)
 24 July – Jozef Peeters, artist (died 1960)
 17 August – Nicolas Lazarévitch, anarchist (died 1975)
 29 August – Jeanne Cappe, author (died 1956)
 18 September – Constant Janssen, pharmaceutical entrepreneur (died 1970)
 24 September – Frans De Haes, weightlifter (died 1923)
 7 October – Maurice Grevisse, grammarian (died 1980)
 21 October – Nand Geersens, broadcaster (died 1959)
 25 October – Robert van Genechten, Dutch politician (died 1945)
 11 November – Victor Soultanbeieff, chess master (died 1972)
 14 November – Léopold Buffin de Chosal, pentathlete (died 1947)
 25 November – Marcel Gustin, Olympic athlete (died 1977)
 27 November – Eugène Gabriels, Olympic rower (died 1969)
 29 November – Henri Liebaert, politician (died 1977)
 30 December – August De Boodt, politician (died 1986)

Deaths
 8 February – Jean-François Portaels (born 1818), painter
 24 May – Joseph Quinaux (born 1822), painter
 16 June – Alfred van der Smissen (born 1823), general
 15 September – Alfred Verwee (born 1838), painter
 16 September – Alphonse Balat (born 1818), architect
 17 November – Jean-Édouard Bommer (born 1829), botanist

References

 
1890s in Belgium